Guy Coëme (born 21 August 1946) is a Francophone Belgian politician for the Socialist Party (PS).

He served as 5th Minister-President of Wallonia from February to May 1988.

Coëme served as minister of defence in the government Martens VIII and IX. In the first cabinet Dehaene, he was promoted to deputy prime minister and served as minister of transport. In 1993, he came under pressure due to the Agusta scandal investigation, which led to his resignation in 1994. He was later rehabilitated, and he currently serves as mayor of Waremme. He is a member of the European Parliament elected in the lists of the Socialist Group and is a member of the 'Commission for Culture, Science and Education', of the 'Subcommittee for Energy' and 'Subcommittee for Cultural Heritage'.

Honours 
 2014 : Knight Grand Cross in the Order of Leopold II.

References

1946 births
Living people
Belgian fraudsters
20th-century Belgian criminals
Government ministers of Belgium
Ministers-President of Wallonia
Socialist Party (Belgium) politicians
Walloon people
Belgian Ministers of Defence
Recipients of the Grand Cross of the Order of Leopold II
21st-century Belgian politicians